

References

Surrey
Parks and open spaces in Surrey
King G
Lists of buildings and structures in Surrey